Scooby-Doo! Mystery Incorporated (also known as Mystery Incorporated or Scooby-Doo! Mystery, Inc.) is an American animated television series that serves as the eleventh incarnation of the Scooby-Doo media franchise created by Hanna-Barbera, as well as the first that was not originally run on Saturday mornings. The series is produced by Warner Bros. Animation for Cartoon Network UK and premiered in the United States on Cartoon Network on April 5, 2010, with the next twelve episodes continuing, and the first episode re-airing, on July 12, 2010. The series concluded on April 5, 2013, after two seasons and fifty-two episodes.

Mystery Incorporated returns to the early days of Scooby and the gang, when they are still solving mysteries in their home town, though it makes multiple references to previous incarnations of the franchise. The series takes a tongue-in-cheek approach to the classic Scooby-Doo formula, with increasingly outlandish technology, skills, and scenarios making up each villain's story, and a different spin on the famous "meddling kids" quote at the end of every episode. Contrasting sharply with this, however, are two elements that have never been used in a Scooby-Doo series before: a serial format with an ongoing story arc featuring many dark plot elements that are treated with near-total seriousness, and ongoing relationship drama among the characters. Furthermore, it is also the first series in the franchise to make use of real ghosts and monsters since The 13 Ghosts of Scooby-Doo.

The series pays homage to the horror genre, drawing on many works from film, television and literature in both parodic and serious ways, from horror film classics like A Nightmare on Elm Street, modern films such as Saw, television series Twin Peaks, and the works of H. P. Lovecraft, alongside the classic monster horror films shown in previous series. In particular, in the second season, the central story arc evolves to heavily feature the use of Babylonian mythology, exploring the Anunnaki, the Babylonian and modern pseudo-scientific concepts of Nibiru, and the writings of Zecharia Sitchin. Other Hanna-Barbera characters occasionally guest-star, such as Captain Caveman, Jabberjaw, Speed Buggy, The Funky Phantom, and Blue Falcon and Dynomutt.

As was the case with the previous three installments in the franchise, Mystery Incorporated redesigns the main characters, this time into a retro look that returns them to their original 1969 outfits, with some small changes (such as Velma now wearing bows in her hair). The series is also the animated debut of Matthew Lillard as the voice of Shaggy, after he portrayed the character in two live-action films, Scooby-Doo (2002) and Scooby-Doo 2: Monsters Unleashed (2004). Casey Kasem, the original voice of Shaggy, voiced Shaggy's father in five episodes, albeit uncredited; this would be his last voice-acting role before his death. Linda Cardellini, who played Velma in the live-action movies, voiced Hot Dog Water, a recurring character in the series. The show also brought back characters seen in previous Scooby-Doo series such as the eco-goth rock band The Hex Girls and Vincent Van Ghoul from The 13 Ghosts of Scooby-Doo, though his character is portrayed as a direct homage to Vincent Price, being a famous horror film actor, rather than an actual warlock.

Plot

Season 1
Fred Jones, Daphne Blake, Velma Dinkley, Shaggy Rogers and Scooby-Doo are a team of teenage mystery solvers who live in the small town of Crystal Cove, the self-proclaimed "Most Hauntedest Place on Earth". The allegedly "cursed" town's long history of strange disappearances and ghost and monster sightings form the basis for its thriving tourist industry; as such, the adults of the town (chief among them being Fred's father Mayor Fred Jones Sr. and Sheriff Bronson Stone) are not happy that the kids are debunking all the supernatural goings-on that bring in so much revenue as the overwrought schemes of charlatans and criminals.

In addition to the traditional cases they always solve, the team finds itself being nudged into the uncovering of a dark secret that is hidden in the past of Crystal Cove. Following cryptic hints from a faceless mystery-man known only as "Mr. E." (a play on "mystery"), the gang unearths the legend of a cursed Conquistador treasure, the secret history of Crystal Cove's founding Darrow Family, and the mysterious, unsolved disappearance of four mystery-solving youths and their pet bird—the original Mystery Incorporated. Standing in the way of solving this mystery, however, there are the romantic entanglements pulling the kids apart: Shaggy finds himself unable to put his new romance with Velma ahead of his longtime friendship with Scooby, while Daphne pines for a trap-obsessed Fred, who obliviously struggles to realize that he shares her feelings, too.

Season 2
The return of the original Mystery Incorporated to Crystal Cove begins a race between the two groups to locate the pieces of the enigmatic planispheric disk, which will point the way to the cursed treasure beneath the town. As the pieces are gathered, it becomes apparent that these two groups are not the only teams of mystery-solvers that have lived in Crystal Cove: many similar groups, always made up of four humans and an animal, have existed, and the secret behind their centuries-long connection will reveal the truth behind the curse of Crystal Cove. The fate of both the gang's friendship and all of reality itself hangs in the balance as extradimensional forces gather in preparation, and the time of Nibiru draws near.

Episodes

The first season of Scooby-Doo! Mystery Incorporated ran for twenty-six episodes between 2010 and 2011 with an unknown stop to the airing of the episodes after episode thirteen. The first episode of the season premiered as a sneak peek on April 5, 2010, and reaired on July 12, 2010 on Cartoon Network along with the next twelve episodes in the United States. The series continued to air on Canada's Teletoon after episode thirteen. The remaining thirteen episodes, dubbed as a second season by Cartoon Network, began airing on May 3, 2011 until July 26, 2011. During the hiatus the first episode of the second season premiered on March 30, 2012 on Cartoon Network Videos and aired on Boomerang in the UK on June 2, 2012 with four more episodes premiering until June 6, 2012. The official Warner Brothers website announced that the second season would begin airing on Cartoon Network in May 2012 but was set back to July 30, 2012 in the United States. The first fifteen episodes aired on weekdays after July 30, 2012, until August 17, 2012. The show went on another hiatus until March 25, 2013, when the remaining episodes of season two began to air in the United States and concluded on April 5, 2013.

Each episode of the series is called a "chapter" in line with the show's overarching story, numbered from 1 to 52 across both seasons.

Cast

Main

 Frank Welker as Scooby-Doo, Fred Jones Jr.
 Mindy Cohn as Velma Dinkley
 Grey DeLisle as Daphne Blake
 Matthew Lillard as Norville "Shaggy" Rogers

Recurring
 Lewis Black as Mr. E (Ricky Owens)
 Linda Cardellini as Hot Dog Water (Marcie Fleach)
 Tia Carrere as Judy Reeves
 Gary Cole as Mayor Fred Jones Sr.
 Vivica A. Fox as Angel Dynamite (Cassidy Williams)
 Kate Higgins as Mayor Janet Nettles
 Udo Kier as Professor Pericles
 Tim Matheson as Brad Chiles
 Patrick Warburton as Sheriff Bronson Stone

Home media
Prior to the volume releases the first episode in the series, "Beware the Beast from Below" was released as a bonus episode in the special features of Scooby-Doo! Camp Scare on September 14, 2010. "Menace of the Manticore" was also released as a bonus feature on Big Top Scooby-Doo! on October 9, 2012. Also, "When the Cicada Calls" from Season 1 and "The Devouring" from Season 2 were released on Scooby-Doo! 13 Spooky Tales: For the Love of Snack! on January 7, 2014. "Night on Haunted Mountain" was also released on Scooby-Doo! 13 Spooky Tales: Field of Screams on May 13, 2014.

Warner Home Video started releasing episodes to DVD on January 25, 2011 in the US. The first three volumes contain four episodes from the series each in order as they aired on Cartoon Network. The final volume (named as Crystal Cove Curse) contains the remaining fourteen episodes from the first season. The first thirteen episodes of the second season were released to DVD (which is entitled Danger in the Deep) on November 13, 2012, while the second half of season two (titled Spooky Stampede) was released on June 18, 2013. Warner Home Video began releasing volumes for the UK on August 29, 2011.

On October 8, 2013 Warner Home Video released the first season of Scooby-Doo! Mystery Incorporated on a four DVD set in the United States. On October 7, 2014 the second season was released in another 4-disc set in the US.

Awards and nominations

Episodic online video game
Cartoon Network released an episodic video game on their website called Scooby-Doo! Mystery Incorporated: Crystal Cove Online, which had a new mystery every week based on the aired episode. The player takes control of Shaggy and Scooby as they explore Crystal Cove, solving mysteries and helping other citizens with the rest of the gang. Although there are 52 episodes, CN stopped updating the game at the end of season 1, making the last mystery "The Freak of Crystal Cove."

References

External links

  at Teletoon (Canada)
  at Boomerang (United Kingdom)
 Scooby-Doo! Mystery Incorporated at Tvguide.com
 Scooby-Doo! Mystery Incorporated at Comic Scooby-Doo Scoob-Tacular
 
 

Scooby-Doo television series
2010s American animated television series
2010 American television series debuts
2013 American television series endings
2010s American mystery television series
American children's animated adventure television series
American children's animated comedy television series
American children's animated fantasy television series
American children's animated horror television series
American children's animated mystery television series
English-language television shows
Cartoon Network original programming
Animated television series reboots
Teen animated television series
Television series by Warner Bros. Animation
Television series by Warner Bros. Television Studios